The 2009–10 CONCACAF Champions League preliminary round was the first round of the 2009–10 CONCACAF Champions League. Sixteen teams were entered in this round, and were drawn into eight matchups that were contested in a two-legged tie. The first leg of each of the preliminary round matchups was played  and the second leg was played  This tournament's preliminary round was scheduled to begin one month earlier than the previous season in order to alleviate schedule congestion for participants due to Fourth Round of CONCACAF qualification for the 2010 FIFA World Cup. The matchup draw for the preliminary and group stages was conducted on June 11. The match schedule was announced five days later on June 16.

Matches 

|}

All match-times are listed in local time.

First leg

Second leg 

Puerto Rico Islanders won 1–0 on aggregate.

Pachuca won 10–1 on aggregate.

2–2 on aggregate. D.C. United won 5–4 on penalties.

W Connection won 4–3 on aggregate.

Cruz Azul won 6–2 on aggregate.

2–2 on aggregate. Árabe Unido won on away goals.

San Juan Jabloteh won 3–2 on aggregate.

Real España won 6–3 on aggregate.

References

External links 
 2009–10 CONCACAF Champions League results at CONCACAF.com

Preliminary Round